George Mills (born 11 May 1999) is an English athlete specialising in the 1500 metres.

He became British champion when winning the 1500 metres event at the 2020 British Athletics Championships in a time of 3 min 51.39 secs.

Personal life
His father is former professional footballer Danny Mills.

References

Living people
1999 births
English male middle-distance runners
British male middle-distance runners
British Athletics Championships winners